Flying Spur (4 November 1992–8 May 2018) was an Australian Thoroughbred racehorse that won three Group One races, most notably the 1995 Golden Slipper.  He was also the Leading sire in Australia for the 2006/07 season.

Background

Flying Spur was from the second crop of champion sire Danehill.  He was born and bred at Arrowfield Stud in the Hunter Region of New South Wales.

He was sent to the 1994 Inglis Easter Yearling Sale where he was bought for $160,000 by trainer Lee Freedman for a group of owners.  The majority ownership of the horse was retained by Arrowfield Stud.

Racing career

Flying Spur won at his debut on the 26 November 1994 at Caulfield.  Two starts later he won his first stakes races the Blue Diamond Prelude when ridden by Mick Dittman.  The following week he ran second in the Blue Diamond Stakes as a 13/4 favourite and backed up again a week later when third in the Sires' Produce Stakes (VRC).  

After a three week break Flying Spur next contested the 1995 Golden Slipper where he started as a 25/1 outsider.  Jim
Cassidy was originally booked to ride the horse in the race but became disqualified from riding and Glen Boss was made his replacement.  In a close finish Flying Spur defeated future Hall of Fame horse Octagonal in second place, with Millrich (future dam of Redzel) in third.  Years later, Boss would say, "Flying Spur was the horse that really put me on the map. I owe a lot in my career to him." 

Flying Spur would win his next Group One race in the 1996 Australian Guineas at Flemington when ridden by Damien Oliver and his third and final major being the 1996 All Aged Stakes at Randwick when ridden by Steven King.

Stud career

Flying Spur was retired from racing after 20 starts to commence stallion duties at Arrowfield Stud.  He performed this role between 1996 until 2012 when he was retired from service due to declining fertility.  As well as being crowned Leading sire in Australia for the 2006/07 season, his progeny amassed over $135 million in prizemoney.  He sired over 1,000 individual winners, including 99 stakes winners and 14 Group One winners.

After being retired from stallion duties, Flying Spur remained at Arrowfield Stud and lived out his days there until dying in 2018 aged 25.  He was laid to rest and buried at the stud.

Notable progeny

Flying Spur's 14 Group One winners:

c = colt, f = filly, g = gelding

Pedigree

References 

Racehorses bred in Australia
Racehorses trained in Australia
1992 racehorse births
2018 racehorse deaths
Thoroughbred family 4-g